Primorskyibacter sedentarius is a Gram-negative, aerobic, rod-shaped and non-motile  bacterium from the genus of Primorskyibacter which has been isolated from shallow sediments from the Sea of Japan.

References

External links
Type strain of Primorskyibacter sedentarius at BacDive -  the Bacterial Diversity Metadatabase

Rhodobacteraceae
Bacteria described in 2011